Baltimore Bullet(s) may refer to:

Sports
 Baltimore Bullet or Michael Phelps, (born 1985), American former swimmer
 Baltimore Bullets (1944–1954), American Basketball League (ABL) franchise (1944–47) and National Basketball Association (NBA) franchise (1947–54)
 Baltimore Bullets (1963–1973), now Washington Wizards, National Basketball Association franchise
 Baltimore Bullets (EPBL), Eastern Professional Basketball League franchise (1958–61)

Others
 The Baltimore Bullet, 1980 film